Mangold (also Mangoldt, Mangolt)  is a German surname, in origin from a given name.
It was the name of a noble family of Weißenfels (Altenburger Land, Thuringia), named for one Manegoldus de Wizenfels (fl. 1260); branches of this family are extant, bearing the surnames von Mangoldt, Mangoldt-Gaudlitz (since 1888) or Mangoldt-Reiboldt (since 1878).
The surname Mangold could arise independently as a patronymic based on the given name; it is currently most widespread in Baden-Württemberg, Germany.

Mangold also refers to several cultivars of beet plants (Beta vulgaris subsp. vulgaris): In English it is a synonym of mangelwurzel (field beet), being also the German word for chard.

Given name
Manegoldus de Wizenfels (fl. 1260), founder of the Thuringian house of Weißenfels.
Mangold von Brandis (d. 1385), bishop of Constance.

Surname
People with the surname include:

von Mangoldt
 Hans Carl Friedrich von Mangoldt (1854–1925), German mathematician

Mangold
 Andrej Mangold (born 1987), German basketball player
 Carl Amand Mangold (1813-1889), German composer
 Christoph Mangold (1719–1767), German anatomist and chemist 
 Hilde Mangold (born 1898; née Proscholdt), German developmental biologist
 Holley Mangold (born 1989), American Female Weightlifter
 James Mangold (born 1963), American director and script writer
 Katharina Mangold-Wirz (1922-2003) Swiss Marine Biologist
 Kevin Mangold (born 1968), American professional Thoroughbred jockey, stunt man and actor
 Mike Mangold (born 1955), American aerobatics pilot
 Nick Mangold (born 1984), American football player
 Robert Mangold (born 1937), American artist
 Sylvia Plimack Mangold (born 1938), American artist
 Tom Mangold (born 1934), British investigative journalist and author

See also

Mangold v Helm
 Von Mangoldt function, an arithmetic function named for Hans Carl Friedrich von Mangoldt.

German-language surnames
Surnames from given names